Euberta is a farming community in the central Riverina area of New South Wales.
It is situated on the old Narrandera road with Millwood 6 kilometres to its west and Malebo 9 kilometres to its east.  At the 2021 census, Euberta had a population of 130 people.
The area is made up of rich pastoral close to the Murrumbidgee River giving graziers the ability to use central pivot and other irrigation systems to grow crops such as Lucerne.

Gallery

Notes and references

Towns in the Riverina
Towns in New South Wales